Ka Whata Tu O Rakihouia Conservation Park is a protected area covering part of the Seaward Kaikoura Range. It is located between Kaikōura and Clarence in the Kaikōura District and Canterbury Region of New Zealand's South Island.

The park is managed by the New Zealand Department of Conservation.

Geography

History

The park was established in 2008.

References

Forest parks of New Zealand
Parks in Canterbury, New Zealand
Kaikōura District
2008 establishments in New Zealand
Protected areas established in 2008